Umbilicus erectus, the reniform Venus' navel (also sometimes nabelkraut or ombelico di Venere reniforme), is a succulent, perennial flowering plant in the family Crassulaceae, in the genus Umbilicus, found in the Southern Balkans and southern Italy.

Umbilicus erectus leaf extract had a highly virucidal effect to Acyclovir (ACV) resistant Herpes Simplex Virus Type 1 in vitro

References

erectus
Flora of Europe